The Walter Reed Biosystematics Unit ("WRBU") is a US Army organization that conducts laboratory and field research on the systematics of medically important arthropods in support of epidemiological investigations and disease prevention and control strategies of importance to the military. Research is carried out worldwide, within geographic or faunistic restrictions of the material available and military requirements. Research efforts focus on the development of accurate and reliable means of identifying vectors of arbopathogens of humans.

The WRBU also performs arthropod collections management for the Department of Entomology, National Museum of Natural History mosquito collection and maintains a molecular entomology laboratory within the Smithsonian Institution Museum Support Center for joint use of WRBU and National Museum of Natural History (NMNH) personnel.

History

Army entomologists began formal collaborations with Smithsonian Institution entomologists as early as 1961.  The WRBU's unit lineage begins with the stand up of the Army Mosquito Project (AMP) in 1964.  In 1966, the AMP's mission was refocused on the vectorborne disease threat facing troops deployed to southeast Asia for the Vietnam War and the unit was reorganized as the Southeast Asia Mosquito Project (SEAMP).  After the war in southeast Asia wound down, SEAMP was reorganized in 1974 as the Medical Entomology Project (MEP) to encompass a broader long-term mission. In 1981, the MEP was reorganized as the Walter Reed Biosystematics Unit, and the unit has retained that identity through subsequent moves and restructurings.  The name commemorates U.S. Army physician Major Walter Reed who in 1901 led the team that established that yellow fever is transmitted by mosquitoes.

The WRBU currently (2017) operates under the direction of the Department of Entomology, Walter Reed Army Institute of Research (WRAIR), with laboratories and offices in the Smithsonian Museum Support Center in Suitland, Maryland.  Collaborative partners in addition to the WRAIR include the U. S. Army Medical Research and Materiel Command, the NMNH, and the Armed Forces Pest Management Board.

Specimen collection

The WRBU assists in conserving the NMNH Mosquito Collection, the largest mosquito collection in the world, with over 1.5 million specimens. The WRBU maintains and secures specimens, handles transactions including loans of material, improves the collection, provides assistance to Department of Entomology personnel, Smithsonian Institution Research Associates, visiting scientists, and mosquito researchers in locating and examining specimens in the collection.

Primary research projects
 Medically Important Vectors: Current and upcoming projects include: a mosquito genus key for the United States Southern Command (SOUTHCOM) Area of Responsibility (AOR); computer-based identification keys to the Anopheles malaria vectors of the SOUTHCOM AOR, including keys to all Anopheles adult and larval mosquitoes of Central America, and taxonomic revision and key to adult Anopheles subgenus Nyssorhynchus of Central and South America; an illustrated identification guide for Anopheles mosquitoes of Africa; creation of identification tools for the medically important culicine (non-Anopheles) mosquitoes of Central and South America; web-based identification keys to Anopheles adult female and larval mosquitoes belonging to subgenera Kerteszia and Anopheles of South America; an illustrated identification guide for the medically important sand flies of Southwest Asia; and a web-based illustrated identification guide for the Phlebotomine sand flies of Central and South America.
 VectorMap: An online, geospatially-referenced website for mosquito, sand fly, tick, mite, flea and host/ reservoir species observation data and distribution models that allows researchers and vector control personnel to access maps that display vector observation data from a variety of databases as points or country-level aggregations, and interrogate these layers to learn more about the observations. Users also have access to supplemental layers representing species richness estimates and predicted species distribution useful in identifying potential new collection locations.

References

External links
 Walter Reed Biosystematics Unit homepage
 VectorMap homepage
 Systematic Catalog of Culicidae
 U.S. National Entomological Collection

Military medical organizations of the United States
United States Army medical research facilities
Biosystematics Unit
Forest Glen Annex